Agrioceros is a genus of moths in the family Depressariidae.

Species
 Agrioceros hypomelas Diakonoff, 1966
 Agrioceros magnificella Sauber, 1902
 Agrioceros neogena Diakonoff, 1966
 Agrioceros platycypha Meyrick, 1928
 Agrioceros subnota Diakonoff, 1966
 Agrioceros zelaea Meyrick, 1906

References

 
Ethmiinae
Taxa named by Edward Meyrick